Destiny Evelyn Wagner (born March 8, 1996) is a Belizean author, television host, digital influencer, model, and beauty pageant titleholder who was crowned Miss Earth 2021. She is the first Belizean to win the Miss Earth title, and the first to win one of the four major international beauty pageant titles.

Background
Wagner was born and grew up from the southern-most town of Punta Gorda in Belize. She graduated with a bachelor's degree in Business Administration from Pace University in New York.

Wagner and her family established a non-profit organization called, "Operation Kingdom" to raise awareness on child hunger and unequal education and to provide sustainable meals, school supplies, and toys in marginalized communities.

She published her first book and was launched in New York City entitled So You Need Advice; the book discussed several issues including sex, love, school, and work that women experience which are frequently considered taboo. She was also the main contributor and editor for “Belizean Blues” which featured poems and short stories in collaboration with other Belizean writers. The proceeds from the work was used to fund the Operation Kingdom.

She is a certified open water diver and conducted a research on manatees with the Clear Water Aquarium.

Pageantry

Prior to Miss Earth
In 2016, Wagner represented Belize at Miss Caribbean United States pageant held in New York City. She won two special awards during the finale — Miss Photogenic and Friendship Award. She also competed at Miss Universe Belize 2019 pageant on September 6, 2019, held in Belize City and was named first runner-up to Destinee Arnold who represented the country at the Miss Universe 2019 competition.

Miss Earth Belize 2021
In 2021, the new Miss Earth Belize organization announced Wagner as the new Miss Earth Belize 2021, replacing the original candidate Aarti Sooknandan.

Coronation night
Wagner represented Belize at Miss Earth 2021 pageant and competed with more than 80 delegates from various countries/territories. Wagner won the competition and succeeded Miss Earth 2020 Lindsey Coffey of the United States. She became the first Belizean to win the Miss Earth title. She was in Fresno, California, during the final competition since the pageant was held through virtual setup for the second consecutive year due to the COVID-19 pandemic. She also became the first Black winner of the pageant in 19 years; the last Black woman to be crowned winner was Kenya's Winfred Omwakwe in 2002.
She's the first to win a crown from Belize any of the four major international beauty pageant titles
and second to place after Sarita Diana Acosta's twelfth-place finish at Miss Universe 1979.

Commendations
The government of Belize had issued a congratulatory statement on November 22, 2021, to Wagner for winning the Miss Earth crown. On Twitter, Prime Minister of Belize Johnny Briceño commended Wagner's historic victory. This followed by a public statement by the Belize City Council to congratulate Wagner and also Belize's opposition area representative for Mesopotamia, Shyne Barrow commended her feat.

Media and environmental activism
On December 3, 2021, Wаgnеr arrived in Belize after she won the Miss Earth 2021 pageant with a welcome ceremony hosted by the Ministry of Blue Economy and Aviation and the Belize Tourism Board where Belize City mayor Bernard Wagner bestowed her a special honor; she was also welcomed wіth а mоtоrсаdе thrоugh thе ѕtrееtѕ оf Веlіzе Сіty on December 4, 2021.

The Mayor of Punta Gorda, Charles Salgado, declared on December 4, 2021, thаt thе street name whеrе Wаgnеr grеw uр іn Рuntа Gоrdа, Belize wіll bе rеnаmеd аftеr hеr as a tribute to her victory in Міѕѕ Еаrth 2021.

On December 10, 2021,  Wagner, arrived in San Pedro Town, Ambergris Caye for an official visit to La Isla Bonita and a courtesy call to the municipal mayor Gualberto Nuñez along with staff from the San Pedro Town Council (SPTC) and islanders with motorcade through the main streets of downtown San Pedro. She made a call to the inhabitants to stop coastal development due to the threat to natural resources such as the barrier reef that supports the tourism and fishing industry.

Wagner advocated to speak up against bullying and denounced a racial attack hurled against her through her Instagram stories posted on January 28, 2022, in which she was ridiculed in social media by Miss Thailand Facebook talk page with more than sixty six thousand followers due to her dreadlocks, stating that her African hairstyle was inspired by cow dung. After this, Baitong Jareerat, Miss Earth Thailand 2021 and who also won Miss Earth Fire 2021, showed support to Wagner and publicly condemned the racial attack made by her fellow Thais and called to stop bullying.

On January 8, 2022, she graced the Miss Earth USA pageant, won by Natalia Salmon of Pennsylvania, held at the Orange County Convention Center, Orlando, Florida, which was also attended by previous Miss Earth winners Lindsey Coffey of the United States and Nellys Pimentel of Puerto Rico. She then traveled to Puerto Rico to attend the Miss Earth Puerto Rico 2022 pageant won by Paulina Avilés on January 31, 2022.

On February 2, 2021, the Belize Tourism Board proclaimed and named Wagner as its Sustainable Tourism Ambassador during a signing of memorandum of understanding with the Association of Protected Areas Management Organization (APAMO) to strengthen its cooperation in the sustainable development of Belize's protected areas. On the same day, Wagner met with ambassador David K.C Chien at the Embassy of the Republic of China (Taiwan) in Belize together with Honorable Collet Montejo, Vice President of the Senate of Belize during the Chinese Lunar New Year Festival, and exchanged ideas on several issues regarding the bilateral partnership between Belize and Taiwan.

She traveled to New York in February 2022 and strutted the catwalk during the New York Fashion Week where she presented the creations of three brands: BeMade, Kirsten Regalado, and Vizcaya Swimwear.

On March 8, 2022, during the International Women's Day, she advocated gender equality in relation to the "Break the Bias" 2022 theme of the global holiday celebrated to commemorate the cultural, political, and socioeconomic achievements of women. As Веlіzе’ѕ Аmbаѕѕаdоr fоr Ѕuѕtаіnаblе Тоurіѕm, she welcomed Marisa Butler (Miss Earth Air 2021), Lindsey Coffey (Miss Earth 2020), and Angelia Ong (Miss Earth 2015) to visit the rainforest and Cayes of Belize on March 18, 2022, as part of the Belize Tourism Board effort to promote the country's tourism industry.

In her capacity as Miss Earth 2021, she travelled to the United States, Vietnam, and other countries.

References

External links

1996 births
Living people
People from Punta Gorda
Pace University alumni
Belizean beauty pageant winners
Miss Earth 2021 contestants
Miss Earth winners